J.B. Hunt Transport Services, Inc. is an American transportation and logistics company based in Lowell, Arkansas. It was founded by Johnnie Bryan Hunt and Johnelle Hunt in Arkansas on August 10, 1961. By 1983, J.B. Hunt had grown into the 80th largest trucking firm in the U.S. and earned $623.47 million in revenue. At that time J.B. Hunt was operating 550 tractors, 1,049 trailers, and had roughly 1,050 employees. J.B. Hunt primarily operates large semi-trailer trucks and provides transportation services throughout the continental U.S., Canada and Mexico. The company currently employs over 24,000 and operates more than 12,000 trucks. The company's fleet consists of over 145,000 trailers and containers.

History 
The company was founded in 1961. By 1983, J.B. Hunt became a publicly held company and has grown into the 3rd largest trucking firm in the U.S.

In 1989, J.B. Hunt Transport began partnering with railroads to offer intermodal service. The initial railroad partnership was with the former Atchison, Topeka and Santa Fe Railway (now part of the BNSF Railway) and has since grown to other Class I railroads including Norfolk Southern, CSX, CN, and KCS. The company's operations are distributed in four business segments (intermodal transport, contract services, logistics and truckload shipping), providing delivery services in the continental United States, Canada, and Mexico. About two-thirds of the company's revenues and profits come from intermodal.

The company introduced a dedicated service in 1993.

Corporate responsibility

Sustainability
The company uses load optimization software systems to decrease empty miles for drivers and GHG emission improving overall route efficiency. J.B. Hunt also reserved several Tesla electric trucks and added the first-ever, all-electric box trucks to its fleet. 

In 2019, the company received the SmartWay Excellence Award from the U.S. Environmental Protection Agency(EPA) for the 10th consecutive year.

Safety
J.B. Hunt has implemented hair testing for all pre-employment tests since May 2006, in addition to Federal Motor Carrier Safety Administration (FMCSA) mandated urine testing. Hair testing can detect prior drug usage for up to 90 days. Drivers are also trained and certified in the safety training program Smith System.

References

External links

Trucking companies of the United States
Companies based in Arkansas
Benton County, Arkansas
Transport companies established in 1961
1961 establishments in Arkansas
Companies listed on the Nasdaq
Companies in the Dow Jones Transportation Average
American companies established in 1961
Transportation companies based in Arkansas